Wallace Eddinger (July 14, 1881/1883 – January 8, 1929) was an American stage actor. He started as a child actor, known as Wally Eddinger. As a child he played Cedric in Little Lord Fauntleroy which starred female child sensation Elsie Leslie.

Eddinger appeared in only two silent films, The Great Diamond Robbery and A Gentleman of Leisure, in 1914 and 1915 respectively, preferring the stage. The latter film still survives.

Eddinger was born to actors Lawrence Eddinger (1855-1928) and May (née Williams) (1858-1944) and had an older sister Lorle Eddinger (1879-1969). He was married twice, first to Ivy Lee Moore-La Grove from 1912 to 1920, and second to popular stage actress Margaret Lawrence (1889-1929) from 1924 until his death. Lawrence had been previously married to a publisher named Orson Munn, with whom she had two daughters. Six months after Eddinger's death, Margaret Lawrence was murdered in New York City by her lover, actor Louis Bennison, after a drunken lover's quarrel. Bennison then killed himself in what was deemed a murder suicide.

References

External links

Wallace Eddinger in The Third Degree 1909 (University of Washington, Sayre Collection)

1880s births
1929 deaths
American male stage actors
Actors from Albany, New York
American male child actors
Male actors from New York (state)